Injection of vinylite and corrosion is an anatomical technique used to visualize branching and pathways of the circulatory system. It consists of filling the circulatory system of the piece with vinyl acetate and its use of corrosion technique for the removal of the superposed matter, that is, the organic matter. The technique of vinylite followed by corrosion, besides having low cost, provides a long period of conservation, satisfying the need of undergraduate students as the study of anatomy.

The technique of filling by vinilite is considered an angiotechnical, which consists of the study of blood vessels. This is used to mark the circulatory system (arterial and venous) with the use of pre-pigmented vinyl acetate to fill the vessels of the part to be studied in order to be able to visualize the ducts and duly filled systems. For corrosion or semi-corrosion, hydrochloric acid is the most viable substance used to obtain templates for the vascularization of organs or parts.

Gallery

References

Anatomy
Anatomical preservation